Thekkathi Ponnu is a 2008 Tamil soap opera that aired on Kalaignar TV. The show premiered on 14 April 2008 and aired Monday through Friday at 8:30PM IST. The show starred Napoleon, Ranjitha, Swarnamalya, Chandrasekhar and Bhuvaneswari.

The show was directed by Bharathiraja and it marked his television debut as director. It was produced by P. Jayaraj under Manoj Creations. It had been receiving the highest ratings of Tamil serials and received high praising from viewers. The show last aired on 20 September 2011 and ended with 750 episodes.

Plot
The story of three villages, three families and three generations. And the generations-long conflict between the families of Napoleon and Chandrasekhar. Another aspect of the story is to portray village girls and how they possess gender equality without having to fight for it the way girls in towns and cities have to. The serial would like to show how, in work and relationships and family, women in villages seem to share more equally in villages.

Cast
Main cast

 Napoleon
 Ranjitha / Bhuvaneswari
 Swarnamalya
 Chandrasekhar
 Pragathi (actress)

Supporting cast

 Devipriya
 Vishali Muralitharan
 Stalin
 Sankarapandiyan
 Senpagam
 Geetha
 Deni Mrugan
 Sridar
 Shivan
 Kanga
 Gayathri Sri
 Sathyapama
 P.Sellakkannan
 M.N Paalu
 Vairamala
 Dhanya
 Saraya
 Markpiya
 Rajesh
 Manokaran
 Dhinesh

Airing history 
The show started airing on Kalaignar TV on 14 April 2008. It aired on Monday to Friday 8:30PM IST. Later its timing changed to Monday to Thursday at 8:30PM IST.

Awards and nominations

International broadcasts
The Series was released on 14 April 2008 on Kalaignar TV. The Show was also broadcast internationally on Channel's international distribution. It airs in Sri Lanka, Singapore, Malaysia, South East Asia, Middle East, Oceania, South Africa and Sub Saharan Africa on Kalaignar TV and also aired in United States, Canada, Europe on Kalaignar Ayngaran TV.

References

External links
 

Kalaignar TV television series
2000s Tamil-language television series
2008 Tamil-language television series debuts
Tamil-language television shows
2011 Tamil-language television series endings